The 17th edition of Miss Ecuador had two elections. Miss Universe Ecuador 1970 was held on May 23 in Guayaquil. There were 16 candidates for the title. That night at the National Club of Guayaquil and directed by the Diario El Universo, they proclaimed Zoila Montesinos Rivera as Miss Ecuador 1970, also won the title of Pearl of the Pacific, we represent ourselves in Miss Universe 1970 in Miami and in Miss Expo International 1970 in Osaka. The other edition was made July 16, 1970 by El Telégrafo. There were 11 candidates where Sofia Monteverde Nimbriotis was also elected as Miss Ecuador 1970. She represented us at Miss World 1970 in London. These two ladies are entitled to as Miss Ecuador, which the Organization Miss Ecuador recognizes as bearers of the title.

Results

Contestants

References 
 

Beauty pageants in Ecuador
Miss Universe